Leon Benois (1856 in Peterhof – 1928 in Leningrad) was a Russian architect from the Benois family.

Biography
He was the son of architect Nicholas Benois, the brother of artists Alexandre Benois and Albert Benois. He built the Roman Catholic cathedral of Notre-Dame in St Petersburg, the mausoleum of the Grand Dukes of Russia in the Peter and Paul Fortress, the Russian Chapel in Darmstadt, and the Alexander Nevsky Cathedral, Warsaw, among many other works. Benois served as Dean of the Imperial Academy of Arts (1903–06, 1911–17) and edited the architecture magazine Zodchii. He gave his name to Leonardo da Vinci's painting Benois Madonna which he inherited from his father-in-law and presented to the Hermitage Museum. The painter Nadia Benois was his daughter, and the actor Sir Peter Ustinov was his grandson.

See also
Benois family

External links

Cathedral of Notre-Dame de St Petersburg
Biography of Leonty Benois
The Grove Dictionary of Art

Russian architects
1856 births
1928 deaths
Leon
Russian people of French descent
Full Members of the Imperial Academy of Arts